List of speakers of the House of Representatives of Grenada.

Speaker of the Legislative Council

Speaker of the House of Assembly

Speakers of the House of Representatives

Sources

External links
Speakers of the House of Representatives

Politics of Grenada

Grenada
Grenada